Rose Baza Calvo is a Guamanian former First Lady of Guam from 1979 to 1983.

Career 
In November 1978, when Paul McDonald Calvo won the election as the Governor of Guam, Calvo became the First Lady of Guam. Calvo served as First Lady of Guam on January 1, 1979, until January 3, 1983. 

The Calvo family owns and operates Calvo’s Enterprises and numerous other businesses in Guam.

Personal life 
Calvo's full name is Rose Herrero Baza Calvo. 

Calvo's husband is Paul McDonald Calvo, a politician and 3rd Governor of Guam. They have eight children, Vera, Kathy, Paul, Eddie, Barbara, Marie, Reyna and Clare. Calvo and her family lived in Maite, Guam.  

Calvo's daughter Dolores “Vera” Calvo Garces is an overseas sales director of Pay-Less Markets in California. 

Calvo's daughter Kathy C. Sgro is a businesswoman. She is the executive vice president and chairwoman of Pay-Less Markets Inc.

Calvo's son Paul A. Calvo is a businessman. He became the vice president and general manager of Calvo’s Insurance Underwriters Inc. since 2002. 

Calvo's son Eddie Baza Calvo (b. 1961), a businessman, became the 8th Governor of Guam. He is also the President/CEO of PMC Investments, Inc., President of Trans Pacific Insurance Brokers, Inc., and Director/ Vice-President of Calvo Enterprises, Inc. 

Calvo's daughter Barbara Calvo Damron is a registered nurse at ClubMD Clinic in Kentucky. 

Calvo's daughter Marie Calvo Benito is an educator. She is an English as a second language instructor at Tamuning Elementary School. 

Calvo's daughter Reyna Calvo is a counselor/group facilitator at Magical Haven. 

Calvo's daughter Clare Calvo is a businesswoman. She is the owner and instructor at Synergy Studio Guam.

References

External links 
 image of Rosa Baza Calvo at mbjguam.com

First Ladies and Gentlemen of Guam
Guamanian Republicans
Guamanian women in politics